Sharon Lovelace Blackburn (born May 7, 1950) is a senior United States district judge of the United States District Court for the Northern District of Alabama.

Education and career

Born in Pensacola, Florida, Blackburn received a Bachelor of Arts degree from the University of Alabama in 1973 and a Juris Doctor from Samford University, Cumberland School of Law in 1977. She was a law clerk to the Justice J. O. Sentell of the Alabama Supreme Court in 1977, and to United States District Judge Robert Varner of the Middle District of Alabama, from 1977 to 1978. She was a staff attorney of Birmingham Area Legal Services in Birmingham, Alabama in 1979, and was then an Assistant United States Attorney for the Northern District of Alabama, in the Civil Division from 1979 to 1985, and in the Criminal Division from 1985 to 1991.

Federal judicial service

On April 11, 1991, Blackburn was nominated by President George H. W. Bush to a new seat on the United States District Court for the Northern District of Alabama created by 104 Stat. 5089. She was confirmed by the United States Senate on May 24, 1991, and received her commission on May 30, 1991. She served as Chief Judge from 2006 to 2013. She assumed senior status on May 8, 2015.

See also
List of first women lawyers and judges in Alabama

References

Sources
 

1950 births
Living people
American women lawyers
American lawyers
Cumberland School of Law alumni
Judges of the United States District Court for the Northern District of Alabama
People from Pensacola, Florida
United States district court judges appointed by George H. W. Bush
20th-century American judges
University of Alabama alumni
Assistant United States Attorneys
21st-century American judges
20th-century American women judges
21st-century American women judges